Phool Aur Angaar ( Flowers and coals) is a 1993 Indian Hindi-language action revenge drama film, directed by Ashok Gaekwad, starring Mithun Chakraborty, Shantipriya, Paresh Rawal, Gulshan Grover, and Prem Chopra.

Plot
Vijay Saxena lives a middle-class lifestyle along with his college-going sister, Sweety, in a small town in India. He gets a job as a professor at the City College, where he meets with Sweety's friend, Sudha Verma, and both fall in love with each other. When a student, Adhikari, attempts to molest Sudha, Vijay comes to her rescue, only to subsequently apologize to Adhikari when Sudha retracts her testimony and ends up blaming Vijay for molesting her. Later Vijay finds out that Adhikari and some goons had threatened to harm Sudha's younger sister, and the duo resume their romance. With the help of Inspector Arjun Singh, Vijay is able to get Kalicharan, the son of gangster don, Natwarlal, arrested and held in a cell, much to the chagrin of Natwarlal. Arjun gets killed, Sweety witnesses his death, and takes Inspector Arvind Phadke to the murder scene, but Arjun's body is missing. Subsequently, Sweety is molested and killed. Later Inspector Arvind Phadke arrests Vijay for molesting his sister. During the trial amidst Vijay's pleas that he is not guilty of this heinous crime.

Cast

Mithun Chakraborty as Prof. Vijay Omkarnath Saxena
Shantipriya as Sudha C. Verma
Prem Chopra as Natwarlal
Mohnish Bahl as Insp. Arjun Singh
Gulshan Grover as Police Commissioner
Raza Murad as Principal Verma of City College
Paresh Rawal as Prof. and principal R. Kothari of City College
Arjun as Kalicharan
Asrani as Khairatilal
Arun Bali as Justice Chaudhary
Ajinkya Deo as Adhikari
Bob Christo as Mr.Richard (Foreign Drug Mafia)
Dinesh Hingoo as Hindi Prof. at City College
Aruna Irani as Mrs. Verma
Goga Kapoor as Chairman of City College
Shashi Kiran as Sadanand, College Canteen Owner
Nimai Bali as Vishal, College Student/Police Inspector
Laxmikant Berde as Ramlakhan Tripathi, College Student/ Advocate 
Satyajeet Puri as Aslam College Student / Doctor 
Rajesh Puri as College Student at City College
Syed Badr-ul Hasan Khan Bahadur as College Student
Raj Kishore as Prof. of City College
Sanam as Sweety O. Saxena
Mahavir Shah as Insp. Arvind Phadke
Gurbachan Singh as Gurbachan
Bhushan Tiwari as Chirajilal Verma

Soundtrack

External links

References

1990s Hindi-language films
1993 films
Mithun's Dream Factory films
Films shot in Ooty
Films scored by Anu Malik
Films directed by Ashok Gaikwad
Indian rape and revenge films
Films about rape in India
Law enforcement in fiction
Indian crime drama films
Indian action drama films